The 2016 Union budget of India is the annual financial statement of India for the fiscal year 2016–2017. It was presented before the parliament on 29 February 2016 by the Finance Minister of India, Arun Jaitley. The printing of the budget documents began with a traditional Halwa ceremony on 19 February 2016. For Budget 2016-17, the government invited suggestions from citizens through Twitter for the first time, even conducting a series of polls to gauge public priorities and expectations from the Budget.

Key points
 revenue loss through direct tax proposals, and  revenue gain through indirect tax proposals. STT (Securities Transaction Tax) was retained at 0.1% for delivery based equities.

Allocations
   fora buffer stock of pulses.
  for agriculture and farmer welfare
  towards rural development
  for roads, railways and other facilities
  was allocated to the Urban Development Ministry, while Housing and Poverty Alleviation got .

Complete list of allocations and receipts can be found on the official site

Reactions
Opposition member and former Prime Minister of India, Dr. Manmohan Singh termed it a "mixed bag Budget" with no big idea.

See also
 Union budget of India
 2016 Railway Budget of India

References

Union budgets of India
2016 government budgets
2016 in Indian economy
Modi administration